Lords-in-waiting (male) or baronesses-in-waiting (female) are peers who hold office in the Royal Household of the sovereign of the United Kingdom. In the official Court Circular they are styled "Lord in Waiting" or "Baroness in Waiting" (without hyphenation).

There are two kinds of lord-in-waiting: political appointees by the government of the day who serve as junior government whips in the House of Lords (the senior whips have the positions of Captain of the Honourable Corps of Gentlemen-at-Arms and Captain of the Yeomen of the Guard); and non-political appointments by the monarch (who, if they have a seat in the House of Lords, sit as crossbenchers). Lords-in-waiting (whether political or non-political) may be called upon periodically to represent the sovereign; for example, one of their number is regularly called upon to greet visiting heads of state on arrival at an airport at the start of a state or official visit, and they may then play a role in accompanying them for the duration of their stay. (For instance, on 3 June 2019 lord-in-waiting Viscount Brookeborough was in attendance at Stansted Airport to welcome U.S. president Donald Trump and First Lady Melania Trump on behalf of the Queen; he and Viscountess Brookeborough then remained "specially attached" to the Trumps for the duration of their visit.) They are also occasionally in attendance on other state or royal occasions. "Extra" lords-in-waiting may also be appointed, supernumerary to the regular appointees, who fulfil a similar role; for example, the Baroness Rawlings, whose appointment as a government whip (and baroness-in-waiting) ceased in 2012, continued to serve as an extra baroness-in-waiting, and represented the Queen on certain occasions (for example on 27 February 2019 she was present at RAF Northolt to welcome the King and Queen of Jordan, while at the same time another baroness-in-waiting, Baroness Manzoor, was present at Heathrow Airport to welcome the President of Slovenia).

In addition, the honour of serving as a permanent lord-in-waiting is occasionally bestowed on very senior courtiers following their retirement. A permanent lord-in-waiting may also represent the sovereign, as often happens at funerals or memorial services for former courtiers.

Political appointments
Most baronesses and lords-in-waiting serve as government whips in the House of Lords. Being members of the government, they are appointed by the sovereign on the recommendation of the Prime Minister and invariably relinquish their position when there is a change of government. 

Currently, there are five lords and baronesses-in-waiting who serve as junior whips in the House of Lords:

Non-political appointments
Alongside the political appointees two non-political lords-in-waiting are always appointed, at the personal discretion of the sovereign (distinguished from their political counterparts by the designation 'Personal Lord in Waiting'). 

Those currently serving in this capacity are:

Additional appointments
Any additional appointees are termed extra lords or baronesses-in-waiting.

Those currently serving in this capacity are:

Permanent lords-in-waiting
Permanent lords-in-waiting are retired senior officials of the Royal Household. Those serving in this capacity include:

References

Positions within the British Royal Household